Jianshania is genus of Cambrian arthropod known from the Chengjiang biota, containing the single species J. furfactus. It was described by Luo et al. in 1999. In 2020, a specimen originally assigned to the species was found to represent the separate fuxianhuiid taxon Xiaocaris pending revision of the type specimen.

See also

 Arthropod
 Cambrian explosion
 Chengjiang biota
 List of Chengjiang Biota species by phylum

References

Cambrian animals
Maotianshan shales fossils
Prehistoric arthropod genera

Cambrian genus extinctions